Erindale may refer to:

Erindale, Mississauga, an historical village located within the city of Mississauga, Ontario, Canada
Erindale Secondary School, the high school named after the community in Mississauga.
Erindale GO Station, a station in the GO Transit network located in the community
Erindale College, the original and still current name of the University of Toronto Mississauga
Erindale, Saskatoon, a neighbourhood
Erindale, South Australia, a suburb in the city of Adelaide, Australia
Erindale College, in Wanniassa, Australian Capital Territory, Australia
Erindale Centre, a 'group centre' in Canberra, Australia